Tariku Getnet is an Ethiopian professional footballer who plays as a goalkeeper for Hadiya Hossana FC.

International career
In January 2014 coach Sewnet Bishaw invited him to be a part of the Ethiopia squad for the 2014 African Nations Championship. The team was eliminated in the group stages after losing to Congo, Libya and Ghana.

References 

Living people
Ethiopian footballers
Ethiopia A' international footballers
2014 African Nations Championship players
Dashen Beer F.C. players
1994 births
Association football goalkeepers
Ethiopia international footballers
Hadiya Hossana F.C. players